Mordellistena imponderosa is a beetle in the genus Mordellistena of the family Mordellidae. It was described in 1931 by Lea.

References

imponderosa
Beetles described in 1931